Gija Joseon (12th century BC–2nd century BC) is the name of an ancient, semi-legendary Korean kingdom that is first attested in historical works of the 13th century AD and later. The narrative of the Gojoseon dynasty that this list describes, has been challenged by scholars in the 20th century.

After the semi-legendary rulers of Dangun and Gija (Jizi in Chinese), Bu of Gojoseon and his son Jun of Gojoseon are attested as the first verified recorded local ruler of Korea. King Jun was overthrown however by Wiman of Gojoseon, a Chinese General from the Yan Kingdom (Han dynasty) who established short-lived dynasty. Wiman's grandson, Ugeo of Gojoseon, would be Gojoseon's last ruler, as Gojoseon was conquered by the Han dynasty in 108 BC.

Monarchs of Gija Joseon

See also
 Gija Joseon
 List of legendary monarchs of Korea
 Gojoseon

References

External links
 李徳懋(:ko:이덕무)『盎葉記 箕子朝鮮世系』
 李徳懋(:ko:이덕무)『紀年兒覽 巻5 箕子朝鮮』Northeast Asian History Foundation(:ko:동북아역사재단)
 清州韓氏中央宗親会　箕子朝鮮王位世系

Gija Joseon
History of Korea
Gija Joseon